Menelikornis is a genus of African birds in the family Musophagidae.

Species
It contains the following species:

References

 

 
Bird genera